The AAA World Trios Championship ("Campeonato Mundial de Tercias AAA" in Spanish) is a professional wrestling championship promoted by the Lucha Libre AAA Worldwide (AAA) promotion in Mexico. It is contested for by teams of three wrestlers (often called "six-man tag teams" in the United States). The creation of the title was first announced in May 2011, when AAA started a tournament, set to end at Triplemanía XIX, to determine the first champions. The physical belts were designed and crafted by All Star Championship Belts.

The championship is generally contested in professional wrestling matches, in which participants execute scripted finishes rather than contend in direct competition. La Empresa (DMT Azul, Puma King and Sam Adonis) are the current champions in their first reign as a team, after defeating Los Mercenarios ("The Mercenaries"; La Hiedra, Rey Escorpión, Taurus) on March 5, 2022. Los Apaches and Los Mercenarios were the two teams, and so far, intergender team to win the championship. Overall, there have been eleven reigns shared among nine teams and twenty-four different wrestlers.

Championship tournament
The tournament to determine the first ever AAA World Trios Champions took place from May 18 to June 18, 2011.

1 For the semifinal match, Los Perros del Mal replaced X-Fly with El Hijo del Perro Aguayo and Los Bizarros replaced Billy el Malo with Escoria.

Reigns

Combined reigns

By team

By wrestler

References

External links
AAA's official title history
Gallery of AAA World Trios Championship belts

Lucha Libre AAA Worldwide championships
Trios wrestling tag team championships
World professional wrestling championships